Santa Croce di Magliano is a comune (municipality) in the Province of Campobasso in the Italian region Molise, located about  northeast of Campobasso. The settlement was formerly inhabited by an Arbëreshë community, who have since assimilated.

In the Middle Ages the Roman settlements gave rise to "casali", or rural hamlets, and in the Hohenstaufen period (13th century) Santa Croce is recorded as a fiefdom of the Stipide family. In 1266 it became a fiefdom of the Monastery of Sant'Eustachio.

Among the local churches are Sant'Antonio da Padova and San Giacomo.

Santa Croce di Magliano borders the following municipalities: Bonefro, Castelnuovo della Daunia, Montelongo, Rotello, San Giuliano di Puglia, Torremaggiore.

Sports and recreation

The soccer team in Santa Croce di Magliano is called the Uninone Sportiva Turris. The team was founded in 1963.

References

External links
 Official website
 official site (in Italian)
 www.santacroceonline.com (web magazine; in Italian)
The Origin and Legends of S. Croce di Magliano

Arbëresh settlements

Cities and towns in Molise